Brad Eugene Wellman (born August 17, 1959) is a former Major League Baseball infielder. Prior to the majors he played at Castro Valley High School.

Signed by the Kansas City Royals as an amateur free agent in 1978, Wellman made his Major League debut with the San Francisco Giants on September 4, 1982, and appeared in his final game, with the Royals, on October 1, 1989.

Wellman's son, Casey is a professional ice hockey player for Frolunda Indians in the Swedish Hockey League (SHL). He is also the brother-in-law of MLB pitcher Tom Candiotti.

References

Baseball players from California
1959 births
Living people
San Francisco Giants players
Los Angeles Dodgers players
Kansas City Royals players
Major League Baseball second basemen
Minor league baseball managers
Gulf Coast Royals players
Fort Myers Royals players
Jacksonville Suns players
Omaha Royals players
Phoenix Giants players
Phoenix Firebirds players
Albuquerque Dukes players